Pasiphila obscura is a moth in the family Geometridae. It is found in Japan and Russia.

References

Moths described in 1929
obscura
Moths of Japan